Antigny-la-Ville is a commune in the Côte-d'Or department in the Bourgogne-Franche-Comté region of eastern France.

The inhabitants of the commune are known as Antinniens or Antinniennes

Geography
Antigny-la-Ville is located some 60 km south-west of Dijon and 25 km north-west of Beaune. It can be accessed by the minor road D111 which runs off the D33 west of Bligny-sur-Ouche and passes west through the commune and the village continuing to join the D906 in the west. The D14 road also comes from Culètre in the north also passing through the village and continuing south to Lacanche. There are also many local roads giving access to the commune. In addition to the village there is also the hamlet of Chamoy in the north. The commune is mostly farmland but there are large forests in the west (the Bois du Petit Rondeau and the Bois de Retraite).

The Ruisseau du Breuil forms part of the northern border of the commune and gathers some tributaries which rise in the commune flowing west through the Étang de Breuil to join the Arroux south of Viscolon.

Neighbouring communes and villages

History
During the revolutionary period of the National Convention (1792-1795), the commune was called Antigny-la-Montagne.

Administration

List of Successive Mayors

Demography
In 2017 the commune had 102 inhabitants.

Culture and heritage

Religious heritage

The Pariish Church of the Assumption contains several items that are registered as historical objects:
A Bronze Bell (1734)
A Painting: The vow of Louis XIII (17th century)
A Statue: Saint Benoit (16th century)
The Furniture in the Church
5 Stained glass windows (Bays 5, 6, 7, and 80) (1875)
5 Stained glass figures (Bays 1, 2, 3, 4, and 9) (1875)

Notable people linked to the commune
Florette Antigny appears in an obituary in the Abbey of Saint-Martin of Autun: VII id Floreta Antigny (13th century).

See also
Communes of the Côte-d'Or department

References

External links
Antigny-la-Ville on the National Geographic Institute website 
Antigny-la-Ville on Géoportail, National Geographic Institute (IGN) website 
Antigny-la-Ville on the 1750 Cassini Map

Communes of Côte-d'Or